Robin Warwick Gibson  (3 May 1944 – 9 August 2010) was a British gallery curator and art historian best known for his work at the National Portrait Gallery in London between 1968 and 2001, including eight years as Chief Curator. He was responsible for many innovations in the management of the gallery and published a number of significant academic works on the gallery's collections during his career.

Life
Gibson was born in 1944 near Hereford and educated at Wychcrest Preparatory School and at New College Choir School Oxford, the Royal Masonic School before reading Modern Languages and a second degree in Fine Arts at Magdalene College, Cambridge. After a brief period at the Manchester City Art Gallery, Gibson joined the National Portrait Gallery as an assistant curator in 1968 and was almost immediately involved in the establishment of the photographic department, the role of which he would significantly develop and expand during his career. In 1975 he was involved in the establishment of Montacute House as an outstation of the Gallery.

In 1983, Gibson became curator of twentieth century collections and reinvigorated the collections by expanding the use of photography, contemporary sculpture and film in the gallery's collections and redesigning many of the galleries. He also began the practice of commissioning paintings of living figures by contemporary artists, stating that "Representational painting is not so central any more to current artistic concerns: there is not the same social structure, nor the patrons to encourage the artists. We are much more interested in the psychological aspect of portraiture now." This occasionally led him into controversy, such as when the gallery's board of trustees rejected a portrait of Alan Bennett by Tom Wood in 1992 to the embarrassment of all concerned.

In 1994, Gibson was made Chief Curator and remained in post until 2001. In 2000 he curated 'Painting the Century: 101 Portrait Masterpieces 1900–2000', writing the book, with an introduction by Norbert Lynton that accompanied the exhibition. He published numerous reference works on art history, including examinations of animals in portraiture and several studies of painting in the twentieth century,   and contributed to the Dictionary of National Biography, Folio, The Independent, Modern Painters & the Museums Journal.   Gibson settled in Hempstead, Essex and became involved with the Fry Art Gallery.   He was a keen gardener, cook and amateur composer, pianist and organist. He was predeceased by his partner of over 40 years, Tom Gligoroff, repetiteur and pianist.  Gibson was survived by his sister Hilary Gibson and his second recent partner, Hitesh Mistry.

Books and catalogues
Catalogue of exhibition of paintings from the Collection of Dr. D. M. McDonald, foreword by Roy Strong, 1970
British Portrait Painters, by Robin Gibson and Keith Roberts , 1971
The Masque of beauty, National Portrait Gallery, 1972
Flower Painting, 1976
The Clarendon Collection, Paul Mellon Centre, 1977
20th Century Portraits, 1978
Glyn Philpot, 1984
William Roberts, an artist and his family, 1984
John Bellany : new portraits, the Maxi/Hudson Collection, National Portrait Gallery, London, 1986
Glyn Philpot, 1884–1937: Edwardian Aesthete to Thirties Modernist, National Portrait Gallery, London 1986
Paolozzi portraits, with an essay by Robin Spencer, National Portrait Gallery, 1988
Lewis Morley photographer of the sixties, foreword by Robin Gibson, with essays by Terence Pepper and David Mellor, National Portrait Gallery, 1989
Contemporary Poets, Portraits By Peter Edwards, A National portrait Gallery Exhibition, 1990. Foreword by Robin Gibson Curator 20th Century Collection. The ISBN printed in the document (0855140314) is invalid, causing a checksum error.
Madame Yevonde : Colour, fantasy and myth, by Robin Gibson and Pam Roberts, 1990
John Bratby Portraits, 1991
The Portrait Now, 1993
The Sitwells, 1994
 Glenys Barton by Adrian Flowers, Robin Gibson, Edward Lucie-Smith; foreword by Charles Saumarez Smith; introduction by Robert Heller, 1997
 Michael Taylor by Robin Gibson, 1997
 Panayiotis Kalorkoti : heads, faces and figures, catalogue essay by Robin Gibson, 1998. 
The Face in the Corner, 1998; new edition: Pets in Portraits, introduction by Chris Packham, 2015
Painting the Century: 101 Portrait Masterpieces 1900–2000, 2000
Stephen Finer : paintings, 2004

Notes

External links
 Painting the Century
 Publications in the National Art Library

1944 births
British art historians
Alumni of Magdalene College, Cambridge
2010 deaths
English LGBT people
People associated with the National Portrait Gallery
Officers of the Order of the British Empire
People educated at the Royal Masonic School for Boys